Black Clouds & Silver Linings is the tenth studio album by American progressive metal band Dream Theater, released on June 23, 2009 through Roadrunner Records. It is the band's last album to feature drummer and founding member Mike Portnoy before his departure on September 8, 2010. The album was recorded between October 2008 and March 2009 at Avatar Studios in New York City, where they previously recorded Falling into Infinity (1997) and Systematic Chaos (2007). Black Clouds & Silver Linings was produced by John Petrucci and Portnoy, and was engineered and mixed by Paul Northfield.

Black Clouds & Silver Linings was a major success for Dream Theater, becoming their highest-charting album on the Billboard 200, where it peaked at number six.

History
Dream Theater began to work on the album in October 2008. Mike Portnoy described Black Clouds & Silver Linings as, "a Dream Theater album with 'A Change of Seasons', 'Octavarium', 'Learning to Live', 'Pull Me Under' and 'The Glass Prison' all on one album." Jordan Rudess said at a NAMM Show that Spectrasonics virtual instruments were used on the album.

Lyrical themes
The album's lyrics were written by John Petrucci and Mike Portnoy, and all except one concern personal experiences about disturbing or difficult moments of their lives. Though most songs were written by Petrucci, "A Nightmare to Remember" was based on a childhood car incident; "The Count of Tuscany" was about an actual encounter he had in Tuscany; and "Wither" was about the process of songwriting for him. "The Best of Times" was written by Mike Portnoy about his father, who died from cancer. "I just wanted to write something that was a tribute to our life together," said Portnoy, who played the song for his father prior to his death. "The Shattered Fortress" is the final part of Portnoy's Twelve-step Suite, reprising and concluding themes and motifs from the suite that began on 2002's Six Degrees of Inner Turbulence album. The remaining song, "A Rite of Passage", concerns Freemasonry; a video of the edited single was released on May 8, 2009.

"Wither" was released as a single on September 15, 2009. In addition to the album version of the song, the single contained an alternate version featuring only a piano and vocals, a demo version with John Petrucci on vocals, and a demo version of "The Best of Times” with  Mike Portnoy on vocals. There was also a video to follow it which was released on November 18, 2009.

Reception

Initial critical response to Black Clouds & Silver Linings was generally favorable. At Metacritic, which assigns a normalized rating out of 100 to reviews from mainstream critics, the album has received an average score of 68, based on five reviews. Rich Wilson, author of Lifting Shadows, previewed the album for Metal Hammer, calling the album "Dream Theater’s finest and most balanced album in a decade." Eduardo Rivadavia of Allmusic gave the album four out of five stars writing, "Black Clouds & Silver Linings is still an archetypal Dream Theater album; one that's unlikely to broaden their audience all that much, but is conversely guaranteed to thrill their hardcore converts with its renewed devotion to the most exigent and stimulating facets of the band's chosen musical domain." Similarly David Buchanan of Consequence of Sound, an online music magazine, said: "that this release will not necessarily bring in new fans but will also not disappoint the current flock, and this is very true. There are no improvements, but no sheer letdowns, either." He gave the album four and a half stars out of five. The album was named as one of Classic Rock‘s 10 essential progressive rock albums of the decade.

The album debuted at #6 on the Billboard 200 selling 40,285 copies. It was the first time in the band's history that they had cracked the Top 10 on that chart, and is currently the band's highest single week sales of an album. The album also debuted at #1 on Billboard Top Internet Albums, and #2 on Billboard Top Rock Albums. The album also marked the first time that the band hit the number one spot in Finland.

The album won a 2009 Metal Storm Award for Best Progressive Metal Album.

Track listing

Special edition tracks
The 3-disc Special Edition included a bonus disc of six cover songs, entitled "Uncovered 2008/2009". These tracks were originally released separately, one per week, in the weeks leading up to the album's release. "To Tame a Land" had been previously released on the 2008 Iron Maiden tribute album Maiden Heaven.

Also included in the three disc special edition are instrumental tracks of the songs, without overdubs or solos.

Deluxe collector's edition box set 
A deluxe collectors’-edition boxed set of the album was also released. Packaged in a silver foil embossed black velvet box the set includes the 3 Special Edition CDs, a 180-Gram Double LP, a DVD with isolated audio tracks for each instrument, a lithograph of the album cover, with only 100 being signed by Hugh Syme, and a mouse pad. Those who pre-ordered were able to download a newly recorded cover song each week beginning on May 19, 2009 until the album's release. 100 box sets contained a "silver ticket" entitling the purchaser and one guest to a meet-and-greet with the band. This version was also a Limited Edition release, only 14,000 were made.

Personnel

Dream Theater
James LaBrie – lead vocals
John Petrucci – guitar, backing vocals, producer
Jordan Rudess – keyboards, continuum on "A Nightmare to Remember" and "The Shattered Fortress", iPhone app Bebot on "A Rite of Passage", lap steel guitar on "A Nightmare to Remember"
John Myung – bass
Mike Portnoy – drums, percussion, backing vocals, co-lead vocals on "A Nightmare to Remember" and "The Shattered Fortress", producer

Additional Personnel
Jerry Goodman - violin on "The Best of Times", "Odyssey" and "Larks' Tongues in Aspic, Part Two"

Production
Paul Northfield – engineer, mixing, vocal track co-producer
Hugh Syme – art direction, design, illustrations
Dr. Rick Kwan - assistant engineer
Leon Zervos - mastering
Dan Mandell - photography

Charts

References

2009 albums
Dream Theater albums
Roadrunner Records albums